Henrik Capetillo (born 1966) is a Danish artist living and working in Copenhagen.  He was born in Sweden and grew up in Denmark where he studied at The Royal Danish Academy of Fine Arts, 1993-1999. Henrik Capetillo's works have often revolved around identity related issues, on a personal as well as formal levels.

External links
 henrikcapetillo.com

Bibliography
 "Conflict and Balance, Henrik Capetillo, Works 1992 - 2010", REVOLVER Publishing, 2010, 

1966 births
Danish artists
Living people
Royal Danish Academy of Fine Arts alumni